Bob Welch is the fifth solo album from the ex-Fleetwood Mac guitarist of the same name.  It was his first for RCA Records.  The album has since been reissued on CD by BMG Japan (in 2001) and in 2012 by Wounded Bird Records.

When asked in an interview to promote his Bob Welch Looks at Bop album, Welch was asked if there were any songs he disliked recording, and Welch described one from this album.

"The easy part is a song that I didn't really want to record, but did anyway, and tried to do my best on it, and then the writer 'kicked me in the teeth' because I had changed a couple of things in the lyrics to make the song more singable for me. The song was "Bend Me Shape Me", on my 1st RCA album, which was a political nightmare to record from start to finish. I was trying to please everybody, and wound up pleasing nobody!"

"It's What Ya Don't Say" became a minor hit peaking on the Mainstream Rock charts at number 45.

Track listing
All songs written by Bob Welch except where noted.
 "Two to Do" (Michael Clark) – 3:33
 "Remember" (Bryan Adams, Jim Vallance) – 3:53
 "Bend Me, Shape Me" (Larry Weiss, Scott English) – 3:01
 "That's What We Said" – 3:07
 "If You Think You Know How to Love Me" (Mike Chapman, Nicky Chinn) – 3:55
 "It's What Ya Don't Say" (Steve Diamond) – 2:45
 "You Can't Do That" – 2:36
 "Secrets" – 3:09
 "Imaginary Fool" – 3:22
 "To My Heart Again" (Tom Snow) – 3:04
 "Drive" – 0:49

Personnel

Musicians
 Bob Welch – vocals, guitar
 Tom Kelly – backing vocals
 Joey Brasler – guitar
 Brad Palmer – bass guitar
 Dave Rodriguez – bass guitar
 David Adelstein – keyboards, synthesizer
 Alvin Taylor – drums
 Robbie Patton – percussion

Technical
 Michael Verdick – producer, engineer
 Paul Lani – assistant engineer
 Tori Swenson – assistant engineer
 Leon Lecash – cover photography
 Sam Emerson – sleeve photography
 Larry Vigon – artwork

References

1981 albums
Bob Welch (musician) albums
RCA Records albums
Albums recorded at Sound City Studios